is a Brazilian municipality located in the state of .

See also
 List of municipalities in Minas Gerais

References

Municipalities in Minas Gerais